Coste Rocks Provincial Park is a provincial park in British Columbia, Canada, located 23 km south of Kitimat on the south end of Coste Island.  The park, which is water access only, was established in 2004; comprising approximately 29 hectares (1 hectares of it upland and 28 hectares of it foreshore).

References

Provincial parks of British Columbia
North Coast of British Columbia
2004 establishments in British Columbia
Protected areas established in 2004